The 2014–15 West Bank Premier League was the 12th season of the top-level football league in the West Bank, Palestine. It began on 13 September 2014 and ended on 5 May 2015. Taraji Wadi Al-Nes were the defending champions.

League table

References

West Bank Premier League seasons
1
West